Capo dei capi ("boss of [the] bosses") or capo di tutti i capi ("boss of all [the] bosses") or Godfather are terms used mainly by the media, public, fiction writers and law enforcement community to indicate a supremely powerful crime boss in the Sicilian or American Mafia who holds great influence over the whole organization. The term was introduced to the U.S. public by the Kefauver Commission in 1950.

American Mafia 

The title was applied by mobsters to Giuseppe Morello around 1900, according to Nick Gentile. Bosses Joe Masseria (1928–1931) and Salvatore Maranzano (1931) used the title as part of their efforts to centralize control of the Mafia under themselves. When Maranzano won the Castellammarese War, he set himself up as boss of all bosses, created the Five Families and ordered every Mafia family to pay him tribute. This provoked a rebellious reaction which led to his being murdered in September 1931, on the orders of Lucky Luciano. Although there would have been few objections had Luciano declared himself capo di tutti i capi, he abolished the title, believing the position created trouble between the families and would have made him a target for another ambitious challenger. Instead, Luciano established the Commission to lead the Mafia, with a goal of quietly maintaining his own power over all the families, while preventing future gang wars; the bosses approved the idea of the Commission. The Commission would consist of a "board of directors" to oversee all Mafia activities in the United States and serve to mediate conflicts between families.

The Commission consisted of the bosses of the Five Families in New York City, the Buffalo crime family and the Chicago Outfit. Since then, while media sources have often sought to award the title of "boss of all bosses" to the most powerful boss, the Mafia has not itself recognized the position to exist.

Among other bosses media sources have presumed to hold the title include Luciano himself, Frank Costello and Vito Genovese. Some have claimed the title of the head of the Gambino crime family, as purportedly the most powerful of the Five Families, which have included Carlo Gambino and his successors Paul Castellano, and John Gotti.

The term has since fallen out of use in the media but remains popular in fictional accounts. Bonanno family boss Joseph Massino was recognized by four of the five families as chairman of the Commission from 2000 to 2004; during this time he was the only full-fledged boss in New York not in prison.

Sicilian Mafia

In the Sicilian Mafia the position does not exist. For instance, the old-style Mafia boss Calogero Vizzini was often portrayed in the media as the "boss of bosses" – although such a position does not exist according to later Mafia pentiti, such as Tommaso Buscetta. They also denied Vizzini ever was the ruling boss of the Mafia in Sicily. According to Mafia historian Salvatore Lupo "the emphasis of the media on the definition of 'capo dei capi' is without any foundation".

Nevertheless, the title has frequently been given to powerful Mafia bosses to this day. During the 1980s and 1990s the bosses of the Corleonesi clan Salvatore Riina and Bernardo Provenzano were bestowed with the title by the media.

In April 2006, the Italian government arrested Bernardo Provenzano in a small farmhouse near the town of Corleone. His successor is reported to be either Matteo Messina Denaro or Salvatore Lo Piccolo. This presupposes that Provenzano has the power to nominate a successor, which is not unanimously accepted among Mafia observers.

Provenzano "established a kind of directorate of about four to seven people who met very infrequently, only when necessary, when there were strategic decisions to make". According to Ingroia "in an organization like the Mafia, a boss has to be one step above the others otherwise it all falls apart. It all depends on if he can manage consensus and if the others agree or rebel." Provenzano "guaranteed a measure of stability because he had the authority to quash internal disputes".

In Italy, a fictional six-part television miniseries called Il Capo dei Capi relates the story of Salvatore Riina.

'Ndrangheta
In the 'Ndrangheta, a Mafia-type organisation in Calabria, the capocrimine is the elected boss of the crimine, an annual meeting of the 'Ndrangheta locali near the Sanctuary of Our Lady of Polsi in the municipality of San Luca during the September Feast. Far from being the "boss of bosses", the capo crimine actually has comparatively little authority to interfere in family feuds or to control the level of interfamily violence.

See also
 The Godfather, film series about the subject

References

Further reading
 Arlacchi, Pino (1994). Addio Cosa nostra: La vita di Tommaso Buscetta, Milan: Rizzoli, 
Critchley, David (2009). The Origin of Organized Crime in America: The New York City Mafia, 1891-1931, New York: Routledge, 
De Stefano, George, (2007). An Offer We Can't Refuse: The Mafia in the Mind of America, New York: Faber and Faber, 
Paoli, Letizia (2003). Mafia Brotherhoods: Organized Crime, Italian Style, New York: Oxford University Press 
Raab, Selwyn (2005). Five Families: The Rise, Decline, and Resurgence of America's Most Powerful Mafia Empires, New York: Thomas Dunne Books,

External links
"The Boss of All Bosses". Time. 2010.

 
American Mafia
Sicilian Mafia
Organized crime terminology
Organized crime members by role
Italian words and phrases
Italian language in the United States